Fandoqlu District is in Ahar County, East Azerbaijan province, Iran. At the 2006 census, the region's population (as Qeshlaq Rural District) was 12,028 in 2,539 households. The following census in 2011 counted 11,448 people in 2,955 households. At the latest census in 2016, the district had 9,833 inhabitants living in 2,953 households. After the census, the rural district was elevated to Fandoqlu District and divided as below:

References 

Ahar County

Districts of East Azerbaijan Province

Populated places in East Azerbaijan Province

Populated places in Ahar County

fa:بخش فندقلو